The Bangladesh Steel Re-Rolling Mills Ltd., commonly known as BSRM, is a Bangladeshi steel manufacturing company based in Chittagong. It is the largest construction steel manufacturer company in Bangladesh.

History 
In 1952, five Indian businessman named Akberali Africawala, Alibhai Africawala, Taherali Africawala, Abdul Hussain Africawala, and Rajabali Africawala, set up the first BSRM steel re-rolling mill of the then East Bengal in Nasirabad, Chittagong. It started its journey with four manual rolling mills. In 1970 the manual rolling mills were replaced with the state-of-the-art Italian built rolling mill.

In 1996, the company installed and commissioned their billet casting plant under the name "Meghna Engineering Works Limited".

In July 2002, BSRM Group incorporated a new company, BSRM Steels Ltd, to fund and operate a turnkey re-rolling mill from Italian supplier Danieli. Construction of the plant began in 2005 on 11 acres just off the Dhaka-Chittaong Highway at Latifpur in Fouzderhat, Chittagong. It was completed at a cost of 3.7 billion Bangladeshi taka (equivalent to $54 million in 2008). The facility began commercial operation in April 2008 with an annual production capacity of 375,000 metric tons. On 18 January 2009, BSRM Steels Ltd was listed on the Dhaka Stock Exchange and Chittagong Stock Exchange. As of 2019, holding company BSRM Ltd retained about 45% of the shares in BSRM Steels Ltd.

BSRM has a subsidiary in Hong Kong named BSRM (Hong Kong) Limited.

See also
 GPH Ispat

References

External links
 

Manufacturing companies established in 1952
Manufacturing companies based in Chittagong
Steel companies of Bangladesh
Companies listed on the Chittagong Stock Exchange
Bangladeshi brands